Lalsi is a village in Kolga-Jaani Parish, Viljandi County, in central Estonia.

The Põltsamaa River passes through Lalsi on its northeastern side, the territory behind the river is occupied by the Alam-Pedja Nature Reserve.

Lalsi is home to Kolga-Jaani St. Nicholas Orthodox Church, which was built in 1872.

References

Villages in Viljandi County
Kreis Fellin